This is a list of mayors of the city of Thun, Switzerland.

Thun
 
Thun